The 2007–08 Portland Trail Blazers season was their 38th season in the NBA. The season saw the team draft Greg Oden with the first overall pick in the 2007 NBA Draft, but he would miss his entire rookie campaign due to a knee injury that required microfracture surgery. The team would miss the season's playoffs.

Offseason
The Trail Blazers were busy on draft day, making three trades. The first trade was with the Philadelphia 76ers. The Blazers traded second-round pick Derrick Byars and cash to the Sixers in exchange for Finnish point guard Petteri Koponen.
The next trade was with the New York Knicks. The Blazers traded Dan Dickau, Fred Jones, and Zach Randolph to the Knicks for Steve Francis and Channing Frye.
The last trade was also with the Knicks. The Blazers traded Demetris Nichols to the Knicks for a 2008 second-round pick (Ömer Aşık was later selected).

On July 11, the Blazers waived Steve Francis. They also traded cash to the Phoenix Suns for Rudy Fernández and James Jones. Fernández would not be on the team's roster during the season, but would join the team the following season. He would be selected to the NBA All-Rookie Second Team and would set the record for most three-point field goals made by a rookie (159). This season would be Jones's only season with the Blazers.

On July 13, the Blazers signed Steve Blake. This marked Blake's return to the Trail Blazers (he played for them during the 2006 season). This tenure would also be his longest with the Blazers, spanning from 2007 to 2010.

Draft picks
Portland's selections from the 2007 NBA draft in New York City.

Roster

Roster Notes
 Center Greg Oden missed the entire season due to a knee injury
 Forward Darius Miles missed the entire season due to microfracture knee surgery

Regular season

Standings

z – clinched division title
y – clinched division title
x – clinched playoff spot

Record vs. opponents

Game log

October
Record: 0–1 ; Home: 0–0 ; Road: 0–1

November
Record: 5–10 ; Home: 5–3 ; Road: 0–7

December
Record: 13–2 ; Home: 10–0 ; Road: 3–2

January
Record: 8–6 ; Home: 3–2 ; Road: 5–4

February
Record: 5–9; Home: 4–3; Road: 1–6

March
Record: 7–8; Home: 3–3 ; Road: 4–5

April
Record: 3–5; Home: 3–2; Road: 0–3

 Green background indicates win.
 Red background indicates regulation loss.

*Total for entire season including previous team(s)

Awards and records

Records
The Trail Blazers had the longest winning streak at 13 as of January 30, 2008.

Milestones

Transactions
The Trail Blazers were involved in the following transactions during the 2007–08 season.

Trades

Free agents

See also
 2007–08 NBA season

References

Portland Trail Blazers seasons
Portland Trail Blazers 2007
2007–08 NBA season by team
Port
Port
Portland Trail Blazers